The University of Santa Cruz do Sul (Portuguese: Universidade de Santa Cruz do Sul, UNISC) is a Brazilian non-profit (communitary) private university located in the city of Santa Cruz do Sul, in the state of Rio Grande do Sul, with four other campuses in Capão da Canoa, Sobradinho, Venâncio Aires, and Montenegro. The institution had its first college founded in 1964, but it was only in 1993 that it became a university. The University also has a preservation area, named "RPPN da Unisc", which has an area of 221,39 hectares and had its creation in the year of 2009, through Ordinance nº 16, of March 18, 2009.

References

Universities and colleges in Rio Grande do Sul
Private universities and colleges in Brazil